The Thing from Another World, sometimes referred to as just The Thing, is a 1951 American black-and-white science fiction-horror film, directed by Christian Nyby, produced by Edward Lasker for Howard Hawks' Winchester Pictures Corporation, and released by RKO Radio Pictures. The film stars Margaret Sheridan, Kenneth Tobey, Robert Cornthwaite, and Douglas Spencer. James Arness plays The Thing: He is difficult to recognize in costume and makeup due to both low lighting and other effects used to obscure his features. The Thing from Another World is based on the 1938 novella "Who Goes There?" by John W. Campbell (writing under the pseudonym of Don A. Stuart).

The film's storyline concerns a U.S. Air Force crew and scientists who find, frozen in the Arctic ice, a crashed flying saucer and a humanoid body nearby. Returning to their remote arctic research outpost with the body still in a block of ice, they are forced to defend themselves against the still alive and malevolent plant-based alien when it is accidentally defrosted.

Plot
In Anchorage, journalist Ned Scott (Douglas Spencer), looking for a story, visits the Alaskan Air Command officer's club, where he meets Captain Pat Hendry (Kenneth Tobey), his co-pilot Lieutenant Eddie Dykes, (a friend of Scott's), and flight navigator Ken "Mac" MacPherson. General Fogarty orders Hendry to fly to Polar Expedition Six at the North Pole, per a request from its lead scientist, Nobel laureate Dr. Arthur Carrington (Robert Cornthwaite); Carrington has radioed that an unusual aircraft has crashed nearby. With Scott, Corporal Barnes, crew chief Bob, and a pack of sled dogs, Hendry pilots a Douglas C-47 transport aircraft to the remote outpost.

Upon arrival, Scott and the airmen meet radio operator Tex, Dr. Chapman, his wife Mrs. Chapman, a man named Lee, who is one of two cooks, and the Inuit dog handlers. Also present are scientists Vorhees, Stern, Redding, Stone, Laurence, Wilson, Ambrose, Auerbach, Olson, and Carrington. Hendry later rekindles his romance with Nikki Nicholson (Margaret Sheridan), Carrington's secretary. Several scientists fly with the airmen to the crash site, finding a large object buried beneath the ice. As they spread out to determine the object's shape, they realize that they are standing in a circle; they have discovered a flying saucer. The team attempts to melt the ice covering the saucer with thermite, but a violent reaction with the craft's metal alloy completely destroys it. Their Geiger counter, however, detects a frozen body buried nearby; it is excavated in a large block of ice and loaded aboard the C-47 transport. They fly out as an Arctic storm closes in on their site.

Hendry assumes command of the outpost and, pending radio instructions from General Fogarty, denies Scott permission to send out his story; he also denies the scientists' demands to examine the body. Tex sends an update to Fogarty, and the airmen settle in as the storm arrives. A watch is posted; Barnes relieves McPherson and, disturbed by the creature's appearance in the clearing ice, covers it with an electric blanket, which he does not realize is plugged in. The block slowly thaws and the creature, still alive, escapes into the storm and is attacked by the sled dogs. The airmen recover the creature's severed arm after the attack.

The scientists examine the arm, concluding that the alien is an advanced form of plant life. Carrington is convinced of its superiority to humans and becomes intent on communicating with it. The airmen begin a search, which leads to the outpost's greenhouse. Carrington stays behind with Vorhees, Stern, and Laurence, having noticed evidence of alien activity. They discover a third sled dog hidden away, which has had all of its blood drained; the carnivorous plant creature feeds on blood. Carrington and the scientists post a secret watch of their own, hoping to encounter the alien before the airmen find it.

The next morning, the airmen continue their search. Tex informs them that Fogarty is aware of their discovery and demands further information, now prevented by the fierce storm. Stern appears, badly injured, and tells the group that the creature has killed Auerbach and Olson. When the airmen investigate, the alien attacks them; they manage to barricade it inside the greenhouse. Hendry confronts Carrington and orders him to remain in his lab and quarters.

Carrington, obsessed with the alien, shows Nicholson and the other scientists his experiment: Using seeds taken from the severed arm, he has been growing small alien plants by feeding them from the blood plasma supply at the base. Hendry finds the plasma missing when it is needed to treat Stern, which leads him to Carrington. Fogarty transmits orders to keep the creature alive, but it escapes from the greenhouse and attacks the airmen in their quarters. They douse it with buckets of kerosene and set it aflame, forcing it to retreat into the storm. After regrouping, they realize that their building's temperature is falling rapidly; the furnaces have stopped working, sabotaged by the alien. They retreat to the station's generator room to keep warm, and rig an electrical "fly trap". The alien continues to stalk them, but at the last moment, Carrington attempts to communicate, pleading with the creature. It knocks him aside, walks into the trap, and is electrocuted. On Hendry's order, it is reduced to a pile of ash.

When the weather clears, Scotty is finally able to file his "story of a lifetime" by radio to a roomful of reporters in Anchorage. He ends his broadcast with a warning: "Tell the world. Tell this to everybody, wherever they are. Watch the skies everywhere. Keep looking. Keep watching the skies...".

Cast

Production

In 1950, Lederer and Hecht convinced Hawks to buy the rights to "Who Goes There?". The cost ended up being $1,250.

In an unusual practice for the era, no actors are named during the film's dramatic "slow burning letters through background" opening title sequence; the cast credits appear at the end of the film. Appearing in a small role was George Fenneman, who at the time was gaining fame as Groucho Marx's announcer on the popular quiz show You Bet Your Life. Fenneman later said he had difficulty with the overlapping dialogue in the film.

The film was partly shot in Glacier National Park with interior sets built at a Los Angeles ice storage plant.

The scene where the alien is set aflame and repeatedly doused with kerosene was one of the first full-body fire stunts ever filmed.

The film took full advantage of the national feelings in America at the time in order to help enhance the horror elements of the film's storyline. The film reflected a post-Hiroshima skepticism about science and prevailing negative views of scientists who meddle with things better left alone. In the end it is American servicemen and several sensible scientists who win the day over the alien invader.

Screenplay
The film was loosely adapted by Charles Lederer, with uncredited rewrites from Howard Hawks and Ben Hecht, from the 1938 novella "Who Goes There?" by John W. Campbell. The story was first published in Astounding Science Fiction under Campbell's pseudonym Don A. Stuart. (Campbell had just become Astoundings managing editor when his novella appeared in its pages.) Science fiction author A. E. van Vogt, who had been inspired to write from reading "Who Goes There?" and who had been a prolific contributor to Astounding, had wanted to write the script.

The screenplay changes the fundamental nature of the alien. Lederer's "Thing" is a humanoid life form whose cellular structure is closer to vegetation, although it must feed on blood to survive; reporter Scott even refers to it in the film as a "super carrot". The internal, plant-like structure of the creature makes it impervious to bullets (but not to other destructive forces). Campbell's "Thing" is a life form capable of assuming the physical and mental characteristics of any living thing it encounters; this characteristic was later realized in John Carpenter's adaptation of the novella, the 1982 film The Thing.

Director
There is debate as to whether the film was directed by Howard Hawks, with Christian Nyby receiving the credit so that Nyby could obtain his Director's Guild membership or whether Nyby directed it with considerable input from producer Hawks for Hawks' Winchester Pictures, which released the film through RKO Radio Pictures Inc. Hawks gave Nyby only $5,460 of RKO's $50,000 director's fee and kept the rest, but Hawks always denied that he directed the film.

Cast members disagree on Hawks' and Nyby's contributions: Tobey said that "Hawks directed it, all except one scene" while, on the other hand, Fenneman said that "Hawks would once in a while direct, if he had an idea, but it was Chris' show". Cornthwaite said that "Chris always deferred to Hawks ... Maybe because he did defer to him, people misinterpreted it".

One of the film's stars, William Self, later became President of 20th Century Fox Television. In describing the production, Self said, "Chris was the director in our eyes, but Howard was the boss in our eyes". Although Self has said that "Hawks was directing the picture from the sidelines", he also has said that "Chris would stage each scene, how to play it. But then he would go over to Howard and ask him for advice, which the actors did not hear ... Even though I was there every day, I don't think any of us can answer the question. Only Chris and Howard can answer the question".

At a reunion of The Thing cast and crew members in 1982, Nyby said:

Reception

Critical and box office reception

The Thing from Another World was released in April 1951. By the end of that year, the film had accrued $1,950,000 in distributors' domestic (U.S. and Canada) rentals, making it the year's 46th biggest earner, beating all other science fiction films released that year, including The Day the Earth Stood Still and When Worlds Collide.

Bosley Crowther in The New York Times observed, "Taking a fantastic notion (or is it, really?), Mr. Hawks has developed a movie that is generous with thrills and chills…Adults and children can have a lot of old-fashioned movie fun at 'The Thing', but parents should understand their children and think twice before letting them see this film if their emotions are not properly conditioned". "Gene" in Variety complained that the film "lacks genuine entertainment values". More than 20 years after its theatrical release, science fiction editor and publisher Lester del Rey compared the film unfavorably to the source material, calling it "just another monster epic, totally lacking in the force and tension of the original story". Isaac Asimov thought it to be one of the worst movies he had ever seen. For his part, Campbell acknowledged that an adaptation would have to change elements from the original, which he considered too scary for most audience members, and hoped that at least the movie would succeed in getting people interested in science fiction.

The film is now considered to be one of the best films of 1951 and one of the great science fiction films of the 1950s. It garnered an 86% "Fresh" rating at the film review aggregator website Rotten Tomatoes from 65 reviews, with the consensus that the film "is better than most flying saucer movies, thanks to well-drawn characters and concise, tense plotting". In 2001, the United States Library of Congress deemed the film "culturally significant" and selected it for preservation in the National Film Registry. Additionally, Time magazine named The Thing from Another World "the greatest 1950s sci-fi movie".

American Film Institute lists
 AFI's 100 Years...100 Thrills – #87

Critical analysis
Some critics have interpreted The Thing from Another World to contain commentary on the threat of Communism in America during the Cold War. Program notes from a Cinema Texas screening of the film stated that "The film is seen as being symbolic of McCarthyism and the fight against communism on the home front."

Film critic Roger Ebert wrote about The Thing from Another World in a 1982 review of the John Carpenter film, The Thing, stating "The Two 1950's versions...(The Thing from Another World and Invasion of the Body Snatchers) were seen at the time as fables based on McCarthyism; communists, like victims of The Thing, looked, sounded, and acted like your best friend, but they were infected with a deadly secret." Film critic Nick Schager also wrote on the films' themes, stating "An early remark by one military official concerning the burgeoning Soviet presence in the North Pole reinforces the Thing's allegorical status as communist 'other' (one can deduce that Hendry fears the creature not only because it's emotionless and sexless, but also godless)."

Related productions
 In 1972, director Eugenio Martín and producer Bernard Gordon made Horror Express, a Spanish-British co-production that serves as a second, looser adaptation of Campbell's novella.
 In 1980, Fantasy Newsletter reported that Wilbur Stark had bought the rights to several old RKO Pictures fantasy films, intending to remake them, and suggested the most significant of these purchases was The Thing From Another World. This soon led to the making of a more faithful, though initially poorly received, adaptation of Campbell's story, directed by John Carpenter, released in 1982 under the title The Thing, with Stark as executive producer. It paid homage to the 1951 film by using the same "slow burning letters through background" opening title sequence. Carpenter's earlier film, Halloween (1978), also paid homage when the protagonist is shown watching The Thing from Another World on television.
 A colorized version of the original film was released in 1989 on VHS by Turner Home Entertainment; it was billed as an "RKO Color Classic".

See also
 1951 in film
 List of films featuring extraterrestrials

Notes

References

Citations

Bibliography

 Booker, M. Keith. Historical Dictionary of Science Fiction Cinema. Metuchen, New Jersey: Scarecrow Press, Inc., 2010. .
 Campbell, John W. and William F. Nolan. Who Goes There? The Novella That Formed The Basis Of 'The Thing'. Rocket Ride Books, 2009. .
 del Ray, Lester. "The Three Careers of John W. Campbell", introduction to The Best of John W. Campbell 1973. .
 "Doctor Who Classic Episode Guide – The Seeds of Doom – Details." BBC.
 Gebert, Michael. The Encyclopedia of Movie Awards, New York: St. Martin's Press, 1996. .
 Hamilton, John. The Golden Age and Beyond: The World of Science Fiction. Edina Minnesota: ABDO Publishing Company, 2007. .
 Mast, Gerald. Howard Hawks: Storyteller. New York: Oxford University Press, 1982. .
 Matthews, Melvin E. Jr. 1950s Science Fiction Films and 9/11: Hostile Aliens, Hollywood, and Today's News. New York: Algora Publishing, 1997. .
 Warren, Bill. Keep Watching the Skies! American Science Fiction Movies of the Fifties, Vol. 1: 1950–1957. Jefferson, North Carolina: McFarland & Company, 1982. .
 Weaver, Tom. Eye on Science Fiction: 20 Interviews With Classic Sf and Horror Filmmakers. Jefferson, North Carolina: McFarland & Company, 2003. 0-7864-1657-2.
 Weaver, Tom. "Kenneth Tobey Interview." Double Feature Creature Attack. Jefferson, North Carolina: McFarland & Company, 2003. .
 Willis, Don, ed. Variety's Complete Science Fiction Reviews. New York: Garland Publishing, Inc., 1985. .

External links

 
 
 
 
 
 Roger Ebert didn't like all the Classics

1951 films
1951 horror films
1950s science fiction horror films
Alien invasions in films
American black-and-white films
American science fiction horror films
Cold War films
Films scored by Dimitri Tiomkin
Films about extraterrestrial life
Films based on science fiction short stories
Films directed by Christian Nyby
Films set in the Arctic
Films shot in Montana
American monster movies
Films with screenplays by Charles Lederer
United States National Film Registry films
1950s monster movies
The Thing (franchise)
1951 directorial debut films
Films set in Alaska
Films about the United States Air Force
RKO Pictures films
1950s English-language films
1950s American films